Black Dollar is the fourth mixtape by American rapper Rick Ross. It was released on September 3, 2015. It features guest appearances from Anthony Hamilton, August Alsina, Future, Gucci Mane, Meek Mill, The-Dream, Kevin Cossom, Wale and Whole Slab.

Black Dollar was released to generally positive reviews. Kenny "Barto" Bartolomei of J.U.S.T.I.C.E. League, who has frequently collaborated with Rick Ross since 2008, said regarding the mixtape, "[Ross] sounds hungry on this project.”

Track listing

References

2015 mixtape albums
Albums produced by Jake One
Albums produced by J.U.S.T.I.C.E. League
Rick Ross albums